The Khichdi franchise is a Hindi language franchise of sitcom series and film created by Hats Off Productions and UTV Software Communications, which debuted on STAR Plus on 10 September 2002. The series has been rerun on STAR Plus and its sister channels several times. Unlike other Hindi sitcoms, which continuously air throughout the year, Khichdi is one of the earliest shows on Indian television to adopt the Western model of appearing in seasons. The second season was called Instant Khichdi, which made its debut on STAR Plus's sister channel, STAR One.
A film was made, based on the previous two TV series Khichdi and Instant Khichdi. It is the first film in the history of Hindi cinema to be based on a television series.

Television series

Khichdi (2002–2004)

Khichdi follows the story of a Gujarati family called Parekhs, who live in an old mansion. The joint family encounters many typically Indian situations, but they try to solve it in the most atypical fashion imaginable. This is a funny bunch of people that is firmly united in their movement to get separated. They want to sell their ancestral property and move out and form their own nuclear families. But the head of their family does not agree. He gives them the choice to walk out and survive on their own; but nobody is ready to let go of the money that is due to them. So they stay together and wait for the 'head' to change his mind or stop breathing, whichever happens first. And this is where the upwardly mobile middle class joint family faces its trials and tribulations. Khichdi is a look at the lighter side of an Indian joint family.

Instant Khichdi (2005–2006)

The series portrays the life of an eccentric Gujarati joint family living in Bombay. The family is led by the elderly Tulsidas Parekh and consists of his offspring, who he acquired at a local carnival. The first season, particularly the initial episodes, focus on the idiosyncratic members of the family who are only united by their desire to separate from each other. Since the patriarch does not permit them to sell off their house and separate into nuclear families, they live on hoping that he changes his mind or passes away. Eventually, they move into a much larger house left behind by a deceased aunt.

-They become overnight millionaires when they discover oil in their older property. The second season portrays humorous depictions of a bourgeois family that is trying to settle itself into higher society with their new-found wealth. They live on in their own eccentric way, trying to ace the lives of the super-rich.

The first season portrayed the trials and tribulations of a joint family and often touched an emotional cord. Later on, particularly in the second season the show started focusing more on the situational comedy, as the characters started fitting themselves into their eccentricities. Several new characters were added during the course of the show. It is largely episodic with most plots running for one or two episodes. At times it runs into subplots that last a few episodes such as the marriages of Miraben, Raju, and Himanshu. Rarely, episodes run into flashback such as the marriage of Praful and Hansa.

Khichdi Returns (2018)

A new continuation series premiered on Star Plus from April 14, 2018. 

The Parekhs gets stuck after the builder escapes in between the construction of their apartment and some people threaten them to kill until they do not return the money taken in exchange of apartments.

Film

Khichdi: The Movie (2010)

A film based on the series, titled Khichdi: The Movie, was released on 1 October 2010 and starred the same principal cast. It became the first Indian television series to be adapted into a film. The film faced stiff competition from big-budget movies like Priyanka Chopra - Ranbir Kapoor starrer Anjaana Anjaani and dubbed Hindi version of Aishwarya Rai - Rajinikanth starrer Enthiran (Robot) and in the end its performance at the box office was termed hit.

Crossovers
Characters from Khichdi appeared in the episodes 25 and 26, titled Khichdi with Sarabhai Part 1 and 2 of Sarabhai vs Sarabhai where Himanshu and Hansa are revealed as distant cousins of Maya Sarabhai.

In 2010 the cast of Khichdi: The Movie made a special appearance in SAB TV's sitcom Taarak Mehta Ka Ooltah Chashmah to promote their film.

Future
After Khichdi: The Movie, makers are planning a sequel to the movie.

Cast and characters

Awards and nominations

Khichdi

Indian Television Academy Awards
Winner
2004: Best Actress-Comedy – Supriya Pathak as Hansa

Indian Telly Awards 
Winner
2003: TV Actor in a Comic Role (Female) – Supriya Pathak as Hansa
2004: BEST Actor in a Comic Role (Male) – Rajeev Mehta as Praful
2004: Sitcom Writer of the Year – Aatish Kapadia

Nominated
2003: TV Child Artiste of the Year – Yash Mittal as Jacky
2004: The TV Sitcom / Comedy programme of the Year
2004: Lyricist of the Year – Aatish Kapadia
2004: Music Director of the Year – Uttank Vora
2004: Director of the Year (Sitcom) – Aatish Kapadia
2004: Child Artiste of the Year (Female) – Richa Bhadra as Chakki
2004: Child Artiste of the Year (Male) – Yash Mittal as Jacky
2004: Actor in a Comic Role (Male) – Rajeev Mehta as Praful
2004: Actor in a Comic Role (Male) – Anang Desai as Tulsidas Parekh
2004: Actor in a Comic Role (Female) – Supriya Pathak as Hansa
2004: Actor in a Comic Role (Female) – Vandana Pathak as Jayshree
2004: Ensemble (complete star cast of a programme)
2004: The Weekly Serial of the year
2004: Scriptwriter of the year – Aatish Kapadia

Instant Khichdi

Indian Telly Awards 
Winner
 2005: Best Actor in a Comic Role ( Female ) – Supriya Pathak as Hansa
 2005: Best Child Artiste (Male) – Yash Mittal as Jacky

Nominated
 2005: Best Sitcom / Comedy Writer – Aatish Kapadia
 2005: Best Actor in a Comic Role (Female) – Vandana Pathak as Jayshree
 2005: Best Actor in Comic Role (Male) – Rajeev Mehta as Praful
 2005: Best Sitcom/Comedy Programme

Khichdi: The Movie

6th Apsara Film & Television Producers Guild Awards

 Nominated:Apsara Award for Best Performance in a Comic Role – Jamnadas Majethia

2011 Zee Cine Awards
 Nominated:Zee Cine Award for Best Performance in a Comic Role – Jamnadas Majethia

2011 Filmfare Awards
 NominatedBest Actress in a Supporting Role — Supriya Pathak

References

External links
 Khichdi officially uploaded Episodes
 Official Site on STAR Utsav
 Instant Khichdi official site on STAR One
 

Indian comedy television series
Indian television sitcoms
Films based on television series
Indian comedy films
Hats Off Productions
2010s Hindi-language films